Several naval ships of Germany were named Sachsen after the federal state of  Saxony:

 :  7,800-ton , launched 1877
 :  29,000-ton , not completed
 :   (Type 124) frigate

German Navy ship names